Subarna Ray Chowdhuri is a noted Indian costume designer from Kolkata. She won the Apsara Critic Choice Award for her work in Parineeta and also won the IIFA Award for Best Costume Design in 2006.

In 2013, Subarna designed for three movies :, Gunday and Ghanchakkar, each of which was distinctly different from the other. Actress Sonakshi Sinha vociferously expressed her concern over the absence of Subarna's nomination from most awards.

References

External links 

Indian women designers
21st-century Indian designers
Artists from Kolkata
Living people
Women artists from West Bengal
Year of birth missing (living people)